Velichko Velichkov (10 April 1934 – 27 October 1982) was a Bulgarian sports shooter. He won a silver medal in the 50 metre rifle, three positions event at the 1964 Summer Olympics. He also competed at the 1960 Summer Olympics and the 1968 Summer Olympics.

References

1934 births
1982 deaths
Bulgarian male sport shooters
Olympic shooters of Bulgaria
Shooters at the 1960 Summer Olympics
Shooters at the 1964 Summer Olympics
Shooters at the 1968 Summer Olympics
Olympic silver medalists for Bulgaria
Olympic medalists in shooting
Medalists at the 1964 Summer Olympics
Sportspeople from Pleven
20th-century Bulgarian people